The men's 1 metre springboard competition at 2013 World Aquatics Championships was held on July 20 with the preliminary round in the afternoon and the final on July 22 in the afternoon session.

Results
The preliminary round was held on July 20 at 14:00 and the final on July 22 at 14:00 local time.

Green denotes finalists

References

Men's 1 m springboard